Tingena penthalea is a species of moth in the family Oecophoridae. It is endemic to New Zealand and has been observed in Wellington and the Tararua Range. The adults of this species are on the wing from December until February.

Taxonomy 
This species was first described by Edward Meyrick in 1905 using three specimens collected in Wellington. Meyrick originally named the species Borkhausenia penthalea. In 1915 Meyrick discussed this species under the same name. In 1926 Alfred Philpott discussed and illustrated the genitalia of the male of this species. In 1928 George Hudson also discussed and illustrated this species in his book The butterflies and moths of New Zealand. In 1988 J. S. Dugdale placed this species within the genus Tingena. The male lectotype is held at the Natural History Museum, London.

Description 

Meyrick described this species as follows:
This species variable in appearance with the brown patch of the forewings sometimes dividing into two distinct spots. The ground colour of this species also varies with some specimens being whiter than others. Also the discal spots may be more orange-brown coloured in some specimens.

Distribution 
This species is endemic to New Zealand and has been observed in Wellington, including on Kapiti Island, and in the Tararua Range. It was regarded by Hudson as a rare species.

Behaviour 
The adults of this species are on the wing from December until February.

References

Oecophoridae
Moths of New Zealand
Moths described in 1905
Endemic fauna of New Zealand
Taxa named by Edward Meyrick
Endemic moths of New Zealand